The 2011 Missouri State football team represented Missouri State University in the 2011 NCAA Division I FCS football season. The Bears were led by sixth-year head coach Terry Allen and played their home games at Plaster Sports Complex. They are a member of the Missouri Valley Football Conference. They finished the season 2–9, 2–6 in MVFC play to finish in a tie for seventh place.

Schedule

References

Missouri State
Missouri State Bears football seasons
Missouri State Bears football